Alsip, Hazelgreen, Oak Lawn School District 126 is a school district headquartered in Alsip, Illinois, in the Chicago metropolitan area. The district headquarters, the Powers Wassberg Lehman Administrative Center, are within Prairie Junior High School.

The district serves all or portions of Alsip and Oak Lawn.

Schools
 Prairie Junior High School
 Elementary schools:
 Hazelgreen Elementary School
 Lane Elementary School
 Stony Creek Elementary School

References

External links
 

School districts in Cook County, Illinois